Moshe Yosef Mordechai Meyuchas (Moses Joseph Mordechai Meyuchas) (1738–1805) was Chief Rabbi of Israel (Rishon l’Zion) from 1802–1805.

Meyuchas was born in Jerusalem to the Meyuchas family. He is the author of Sha’ar ha-Mayim (Salonika, 1768) Berachot Mayim (Salonika, 1789,) and Mayin Shaal (Salonika, 1799)

References

Meyuchas, Moshe Yosef Mordechai
Meyuchas, Moshe Yosef Mordechai
1738 births
1805 deaths